Medical University of the Americas – Belize (MUA-B) was a medical school located in San Pedro Town, Belize from 2001 to 2007. As of January 25, 2010, MUA-B is no longer a recognized institution in Belize.

References

Educational institutions established in 2001
2001 establishments in Belize